Kate Heron Pahl (born 1962) is Professor of Literacies and Head of Education and Social Research Institute at Manchester Metropolitan University. Her work  draws on arts and humanities methodologies to co-produce knowledge with community partners and the intersections between arts methodologies and community cohesion. Her publications have drawn on literary theory, New Literacy Studies and social anthropology.

Books

References 

1962 births
Living people
Literacy advocates
Academics of Manchester Metropolitan University
Alumni of the University of Cambridge
20th-century British women writers
21st-century British women writers